The 2009–10 season was the 120th season in the existence of FC Girondins de Bordeaux and the club's 19th consecutive season in the top flight of French football. In addition to the domestic league, Bordeaux participated in this season's editions of the Coupe de France, the Coupe de la Ligue, the Trophée des Champions, and the UEFA Champions League.

Season summary
Bordeaux made a good run in the Champions League, reaching the quarter-finals before being knocked out by Lyon. Bordeaux's poor league form saw them drop down to 6th, ensuring that there would be no repeat of European adventure next season.

Manager Laurent Blanc resigned at the end of the season, on 16 May, after 3 years in charge. This was controversial, as Blanc immediately made an inquiry about the position as manager of the national team, prompting chairman Jean-Louis Triaud to demand compensation from the French Football Federation.

Squad
Squad at end of season

Left club during season

Competitions

Overview

Trophée des Champions

Ligue 1

League table

Results summary

Results by round

Matches

Coupe de France

Coupe de la Ligue

UEFA Champions League

Group stage

Knockout phase

Round of 16

Quarter-finals

Notes and references

Notes

References

FC Girondins de Bordeaux seasons
Bordeaux